Moszczenica  is a village in Gorlice County, Lesser Poland Voivodeship, in southern Poland. It is the seat of the gmina (administrative district) called Gmina Moszczenica.

The village has a population of 4,706.

References

Moszczenica
Kingdom of Galicia and Lodomeria
Kraków Voivodeship (1919–1939)